William Mayes (17 July 1885 — 5 February 1946) was an English cricketer. He was a right-handed batsman and a right-arm fast bowler who played first-class cricket for Essex. He was born in Marylebone and died in Esher.

Mayes made his only first-class appearance during the 1914 season, in a County Championship match against Middlesex. Mayes' sole first-class contribution was two runs, prior to being run out, in an innings defeat.

Six years later, Mayes made two Minor Counties Championship appearances for Essex's Second XI.

External links
William Mayes at Cricket Archive

1885 births
1946 deaths
English cricketers
Essex cricketers